Goosetongue is a common name for several plants and may refer to:

Achillea ptarmica, native to Europe and western Asia
Galium aparine
Melissa officinalis
Plantago maritima